César Vinicio Cervo de Luca (born 19 May 1979), known as just César, is a Brazilian football coach and former defender. César also holds Italian nationality through descent.

He is currently in charge as Alfredo Aglietti's assistant coach at Serie B club Brescia.

Playing career
Born in Rio de Janeiro, Brazil, César started his career with hometown club Fluminense.

Chievo and Catania
In January 2004, he was signed by Italian Serie A club Chievo on free transfer. He signed a 6 months contract with option to extend to 30 June 2007. In January 2005 he was loaned to Serie B club Catania along with Higo. Catania later bought him in co-ownership deal for €150,000. He followed the team promoted to Serie A and played his first Serie A match on 18 February 2007 against Fiorentina since he left Chievo 3 years before. That season he only played 8 Serie A matches.  In June 2007, Chievo was announced to buy back the player from Catania through closed tender bid mediated by Lega Calcio, for €440,000. He was a regular starter for Chievo in 2007–08 Serie B, partnered with Davide Mandelli, winning the cadetto that season and promoted back to Serie A in 2008. With arrival of Santiago Morero and Mario Yepes, César became a backup again in 2008–09 Serie A.

Padova
In January 2009, he was loaned to Padova. He won Lega Pro Prima Divisione runner-up with team and promoted to Serie B. But Padova did not excise the rights to buy him in co-ownership deal. However, in July 2009 he was signed outright for free, agreed a 2-year contract.

Post-playing and coaching career
After retirement as a professional footballer, César became a "team manager" of Virtus Entella.

On May 2019, he joined Alfredo Aglietti's coaching staff at Verona. He subsequently followed Aglietti at Chievo and Reggina. On 21 December 2022, César was hired by Brescia as an assistant following Aglietti's appointment as head coach.

Honours
Serie B: 2008

References

External links
 Football.it Profile 
 La Gazzetta dello Sport Profile (2007–08 season) 
 La Gazzetta dello Sport Profile 
 Futpedia Profile 

1979 births
Living people
Brazilian footballers
Brazilian expatriate footballers
Fluminense FC players
A.C. ChievoVerona players
Catania S.S.D. players
Calcio Padova players
S.S. Juve Stabia players
U.S. Cremonese players
Virtus Entella players
Serie A players
Serie B players
Expatriate footballers in Italy
Brazilian expatriate sportspeople in Italy
Citizens of Italy through descent
Brazilian people of Italian descent
Association football central defenders
Sportspeople from Rio de Janeiro (state)